The 2021 Canoe Sprint European Championships (31st) was held from 3 to 6 June 2021 in Poznań, Poland.

Canoe sprint

Medal table

Men

Women

Paracanoe

Medal table

Medal events
 Non-Paralympic classes

Notes

References

External links
Official website
Results book (archived)

Canoe Sprint European Championships
European Championships
Canoe Sprint European Championships
International sports competitions hosted by Poland
Sport in Poznań
Canoeing in Poland
Canoe Sprint European Championships